Khushali (also spelled Khushhali, Khushiali), a word originating in Persian ( xošhâli), where it means 'happiness, prosperity', can refer to:

Isma'ili religious festivals
 Saligrah Khushali
 Imamat Day

People

Real
 Khushali Kumari Dua (1990-), Indian singer
 Khushali Vyas, a contestant on Ace of Space 2, an Indian reality television show

Fictitious
 A character in Kesar, an Indian television serial

Ethnic groups
 Khushali, a sub-tribe of the Torikhel clan in Pakistan

Organisations
 Khushhali Microfinance Bank